The SIU Edwardsville Cougars baseball team represents Southern Illinois University Edwardsville in NCAA Division I college baseball. They compete as members of the Ohio Valley Conference. SIUE plays its home games at Roy E. Lee Field at Simmons Baseball Complex, located in the northwest corner of the campus.

History
The Cougars baseball program was started in 1967–68 by Roy Lee, who headed it for its first eleven years. In that time, his teams built a record of 237–144–3, going to 8 consecutive NCAA Division II playoffs and 3 Division II College World Series, with a runner-up finish in 1976.

After Coach Lee's retirement, the program was led for 34 years by SIUE alumnus Gary Collins. Collins' teams won 1028 games (with 766 loses & 7 ties). While still in Division II, his teams made 14 NCAA appearances and went to the Division II College World Series 5 times. He led them into Division I and the Ohio Valley Conference, where the Cougars completed their first season in the OVC in 2012 with an overall record of 27–28 and a conference record of 13–14, which tied for fifth place in the ten-team league.

In 2012, Gary Collins moved from coaching to become SIUE's first Director of Development for Intercollegiate Athletics.

With Collins' job change, after thirteen seasons as Collins' assistant, SIUE alumnus Tony Stoecklin was named acting head coach for 2013 and continued as head coach from 2014.

The 2014 squad became the first to qualify for the OVC Baseball Tournament, earning the No. 4 seed in the six team field.

Stoecklin was reassigned within the athletic department in mid-April 2016, with assistant Danny Jackson named as interim coach and a national search for a new coach to be launched after the season.

On June 24, 2016, Sean Lyons, the associate head coach at Bradley, was named the fourth head coach in Cougars' history.

Record by year

¶ = season ended early by the COVID-19 pandemic.

Notable former players
Through the years, many Cougars have gone on to play professionally, and twenty-one have been named All-Americans for their play at SIUE.

 Mike Allaria/Third Base 1972
 Nick Baltz/Pitcher 1975
 Tim Bateman/Pitcher 1990
 Mark Bugger/Shortstop 2000 & Second Base 2001
 Dan Cole/ First Base1972
 Ryan Cox/ Pitcher 1997
 Tim Degener/Catcher 1991
 Pete Delkus/Pitcher 1985
 Tony Duenas/First Base & Pitcher 1985
 Doug Duncan/First Base 1994
 Bret Giaudrone/Pitcher 2001
 Kyle Jones/Pitcher 2006
 Chris Kabbes/Outfield 1992
 Chad Opel/Shortstop 2001
 Dustin Quattrocchi/Pitcher 2012
 P.J. Riley/Outfield 1989
 Mike Robertson/Third Base 1997
 Ted Smith/Pitcher 1983
 John Urban/Third Base 1976
 Darrell Wehrend/Outfield 1982
 Matt Wilkinson/Pitcher 2001

 The most successful professional baseball player out of SIUE was John "Champ" Summers who played only one season for the Cougars before signing a pro contract after being seen by a major league scout while playing softball. Summers played for six teams during an eleven-year Major League career.
 Clay Zavada has pitched in the majors for the Arizona Diamondbacks, but is possibly better known for his award-winning mustache.
 Over the years, more than fifty former Cougars have played baseball in the major and minor leagues, but most have gone on to careers in other fields.

See also
 List of NCAA Division I baseball programs
 Roy E. Lee Field at Simmons Baseball Complex

References

External links
 

 
1967 establishments in Illinois
Baseball teams established in 1967